Richard C. Nowakowski is a former member of the Wisconsin State Assembly.

Biography
Nowakowski was born on September 17, 1933 in Milwaukee.  He attended South Division High School before moving on to Marquette University and the University of Miami. Nowakowski is a member of the Polish National Alliance, the Knights of Columbus and is a past Vice President of the Society of the Holy Name.

Career
Nowakowski was a member of the Assembly from 1961 to 1963. He is a Democrat.

References

External links
The Political Graveyard

Politicians from Milwaukee
Democratic Party members of the Wisconsin State Assembly
21st-century Roman Catholics
Marquette University alumni
University of Miami alumni
1933 births
Living people
Catholics from Wisconsin
South Division High School alumni